Kevin Shawcross (1948–1987) was an Australian professional squash player.

Career
Born in Lithgow, New South Wales, Shawcross was a world's top 15 player and represented Australia in the 1976 World Team Squash Championships, where he won a bronze medal. Shawcross became the World Amateur Champion in 1976 after defeating Dave Scott from South Africa. One year previous he won both the Australian and British Amateur Championships. He was unusual because he played weighing in at 101 kilograms (16 stone) and was 6 feet 2 inches tall.

He died at the early age of 38 following a heart attack.

References

Australian male squash players
1948 births
1987 deaths
People from the Central Tablelands
Sportsmen from New South Wales
20th-century Australian people